Donald Smith Buddo (November 6, 1886 – July 27, 1965) was a Canadian athlete who competed at the 1908 Summer Olympics in London. He was born in Montreal, Quebec and died in London, Ontario.

In the 800 metres event, Buddo finished third in his initial semifinal heat and did not advance to the final.

Buddo lost his preliminary heat of the 400 metres competition to Georges Malfait, with a time of 51.2 seconds to Malfait's 50.0 seconds and did not advance to the semifinals.

He was also a member of the Canadian relay team which was eliminated in the first round of the medley relay event.

Prior to the First World War, he played hockey with the famed Montreal Wanderers. In 1910 Don Buddo was a star halfback with the Edmonton Club of the old Western Football league.

References

Sources
 profile
 
 
 

1886 births
1965 deaths
Athletes (track and field) at the 1908 Summer Olympics
Olympic track and field athletes of Canada
Canadian male middle-distance runners
Athletes from Montreal
Anglophone Quebec people
Players of Canadian football from Quebec
Ice hockey people from Quebec